Moura may refer to:

Places
 Moura, Mali
 Moura, Portugal
 Moura, Queensland, Australia
 Rolim de Moura, Brazil

People
 Moura (surname), a Portuguese-language surname
 Moura Budberg (1892–1974), Russian adventuress and suspected double agent
 Saint Moura, 3rd century Egyptian martyr

Other
 Enchanted Moura, a supernatural being from the fairy tales of Portuguese and Galician folklore
 Moura (album), or the title song, by Ana Moura
 Moura (grape), a name for the French wine grape 'Fer'
 Moura wine, a Portuguese wine region

See also
 
 Mourad (disambiguation)
 Mourao (disambiguation)